The City-Bahn Chemnitz is a railway company operating regional train services in Chemnitz area, Saxony, Germany. Most services run both on railway network around Chemnitz as well as on the urban tram network in Chemnitz. City-Bahn Chemnitz was founded on March 10, 1997.

See also

References

External links 
 
 Company's official homepage

Railway companies of Germany
Transport in Saxony
Transport in Chemnitz
Companies based in Chemnitz